Divellomelon hillieri is a species of air-breathing land snails, terrestrial pulmonate gastropod mollusks in the family Camaenidae. This species is endemic to Australia.

References 

Gastropods of Australia
Divellomelon
Vulnerable fauna of Australia
Gastropods described in 1910
Taxonomy articles created by Polbot